"Erk Gah" (later known as "Hold to the Zero Burn, Imagine") is a song written by Tim Hodgkinson for the English avant-rock group Henry Cow. "Erk Gah" was performed live by the band between 1976 and 1978, but was never recorded in the studio. Three live performances of "Erk Gah" were later released in volumes 6, 8 and 10 of The 40th Anniversary Henry Cow Box Set in January 2009; Volume 6 (Stockholm & Göteborg) was released in advance of the box set in September 2008. In 1993, 15 years after Henry Cow split up, Hodgkinson recorded the composition under the title "Hold to the Zero Burn, Imagine" and released it on his second solo album, Each in Our Own Thoughts (1994).

"Erk Gah" was the second of two "epic" compositions Hodgkinson wrote for Henry Cow, the first being "Living in the Heart of the Beast" (1974).

Development
Hodgkinson wrote the words and music for "Erk Gah" in mid-1976. It is a 17-minute, "12-tone, atonal" extended song that he described as "dry, astringent, angular, with no compromise to rock music". Known for his "complicated" compositions for Henry Cow ("Amygdala" from Legend, "Living in the Heart of the Beast" from In Praise of Learning), "Erk Gah" was initially a challenge for the group to learn, but by the end of 1976 they had performed it live several times with their singer Dagmar Krause negotiating the lyrics.

In December 1976 Hodgkinson requested that "Erk Gah" be withdrawn from the band's repertoire until he had rewritten the lyrics. The group, however, felt it should remain on their set list until it was changed, and they continued to perform it. In July 1977 the group, already having made anti-capitalist statements in their music, wanted to make an anti-fascist statement to "critique the rightist elements" in the burgeoning punk movement. It was suggested that "Erk Gah" new lyrics should reflect this stance. In January 1978, as Henry Cow prepared to depart for Switzerland to make their next album, with "Erk Gah" on the list of pieces to record, Hodgkinson presented his revised lyrics of the song to the group. They rejected them, and asked Chris Cutler, the band's drummer and part-time lyricist to write new texts for the piece. Cutler was unable to do so in the short period of time left before the recording sessions were due to begin, and the band decided to shelve "Erk Gah" until new lyrics were written.

Henry Cow continued to perform "Erk Gah" live several times in 1978, but this time reworked as an instrumental because Krause had left the band due to ill health. They went to the studio for the last time in August 1978 to record their last album, Western Culture (1979), but did not include "Erk Gah". The band split up after making the album. In 1993, "Erk Gah" was recorded for the first time in the studio, with the unrevised lyrics, by Hodgkinson under the title "Hold to the Zero Burn, Imagine" for his second solo album Each in Our Own Thoughts (1994). The recording session was a Henry Cow reunion of sorts in that ex-band members Krause, Cutler and Lindsay Cooper recorded the piece with Hodgkinson. In 2008 Hodgkinson said that "In retrospect I far prefer the Cow version to the later studio version. The live one sounds more dynamic."

Title
Hodgkinson wrote "Erk Gah" to include scores for each of the instruments featured in Henry Cow, including the drums. When guitarist Fred Frith looked at his part at the first rehearsal of the piece in 1976, he cried out "Erk Gah" in the same way that Don Martin's cartoon characters express shook and dismay. Frith's utterance became the composition's provisional title, and then the working title, which remained until Henry Cow broke up in 1978. It was only when Hodgkinson recorded the piece in the studio for his second solo album Each in Our Own Thoughts in 1993 that he assigned it the formal title of "Hold to the Zero Burn, Imagine".

Composition and structure
"Erk Gah" is a fully notated, eighteen-minute work comprising five large movements linked to five sections of text. In his 2019 book Henry Cow: The World Is a Problem, Benjamin Piekut wrote that Hodgkinson built the piece around the vocal melody, unlike his earlier "Living in the Heart of the Beast" where the lyrics where added later when Krause joined the band. Hodgkinson described his composition as "a wild, shifting, fluid chaos of transient forms", and Piekut concurred, adding that "tonal, textural, and rhythmic elements mutate often throughout the work".

The first movement of the piece summarizes musical styles and motifs that appear in the subsequent movements, which each have their own musical identity. Piekut noted that here the composer presents "an oscillating figure that marks the entire piece; often appearing in the voice, this figure has Krause rocking back and forth between two pitches". Also present is "a rhythmic figure in which successive beats are divided into an increasing or decreasing number of attacks", that is "acceleration or deceleration takes place inside a steady tempo". The second movement begins with the trial of the song's protagonist and narrator. Here the timbre and texture of the work changes, which now features "contrapuntal relations among the various instruments". Piekut said no percussion is used here and cello, flute, saxophone, organ and guitar are heard in "a twelve-tone pitch space that refuses any tonal center".

In the third movement the narrator reflects on the optimism of the past, and the music "re-centers around E, a tritone up from the B-flat tonal center" that the piece began with. Krause sings "long melodies in a pitch sequence from the first movement" that soon begins oscillating between C and B-flat. Piekut stated that Hodgkinson "modulates the meter and tempo such that Krause's voice remains un-disturbed while the rhythms shift erratically underneath". In the next movement the narrator experiences "loss and nothingness", and this is the only movement that does not start with singing. Piekut described this section as having a "chamber music feel, with many instruments offering atomistic and brittle gestures that cohere at times into unison lines". In this movement Hodgkinson "introduces a new rhythmic motive shared by all but heard frequently in the bass with an oscillating tritone". The final movement, where the narrator expresses "fury", brings the work to a close with "long tones in the bass that support counterpoint between organ and voice". Also included here are several new melodic phrases.

Piekut concluded that "Erk Gah" "holds little converse with rock convention. It sounds more like modernist chamber music scored mainly for amplified instruments". He added that "[t]here is very little repetition and no single drumbeat to speak of", although there are some "eruptive squeals" that are suggestive of free jazz.

Reception
In a review of Stockholm & Göteborg in Clouds and Clocks, Beppe Colli complained that "Erk Gah" sounds a little too similar to Hodgkinson's "Living in the Heart of the Beast", and found Krause's singing "quite heavy" and "bordering on kitsch in its emphasis". But Colli liked the instrumental section in the song's last movement, which he described as "very beautiful", and said the mixing "has worked wonders in presenting at their best all the compositional elements according to their role in the whole."

Writing in AllMusic, François Couture called Henry Cow's performance of "Erk Gah" on Stockholm & Göteborg "a tour de force of complex avant-garde rock".

Live performances
Henry Cow never recorded "Erk Gah" in the studio but did perform it live a number of times between 1976 and 1978, including:
25 August 1976 in Vevey, Switzerland for the Swiss TV program, Kaleidospop
Released on DVD in Volume 10: Vevey of The 40th Anniversary Henry Cow Box Set, the only known video recording of Henry Cow
September and November 1976 in Italy and France
9 May 1977 in Stockholm, Sweden for the Sveriges Radio program, Tonkraft, broadcast on 8 June and 11 June 1977
Released in Volume 6: Stockholm & Göteborg of The 40th Anniversary Henry Cow Box Set; also released on a separate CD in September 2008 in advance of the box set release, making it the first officially released version of Henry Cow performing the song
May and June 1977 in Sweden and Southend-on-Sea, England
November and December 1977 in France and the Netherlands
January 1978 in Switzerland
22 March 1978 in Bremen, Germany for Radio Bremen – extracts from a live broadcast
Released in Volume 8: Bremen of The 40th Anniversary Henry Cow Box Set – an instrumental version of the composition necessitated by the band being without a vocalist at the time

Personnel

"Hold to the Zero Burn, Imagine" (1994)
Dagmar Krause – voice
Chris Cutler – drums
Bill Gilonis – guitar
Lindsay Cooper – bassoon
Richard Bolton – cello
Guy Segers – bass guitar
Dominic Weeks – xylophone
Nancy Ruffer – flute
Clarissa Melville – flute
Jonathan Impett – trumpet
Tim Hodgkinson – keyboards, alto saxophone, clarinet

References

Works cited

External links
The original "Erk Gah" lyrics. The Canterbury Website.

1976 songs
Henry Cow songs
Songs about prison